The 150th Massachusetts General Court, consisting of the Massachusetts Senate and the Massachusetts House of Representatives, met in 1937 and 1938.

Senators

Representatives

See also
 1938 Massachusetts gubernatorial election
 75th United States Congress
 List of Massachusetts General Courts

References

External links
 
 
 
 

Political history of Massachusetts
Massachusetts legislative sessions
massachusetts
1937 in Massachusetts
massachusetts
1938 in Massachusetts